Roy Mitchell Kinnear (8 January 1934 – 20 September 1988) was an English character actor. He was known for his roles in films such as The Beatles' Help! (1965), Clapper in How I Won the War (1967) and Planchet in The Three Musketeers (1973). He reprised the role of Planchet in the 1974 and 1989 sequels, and died following an accident during filming of the latter. 
He played Private Monty Bartlett in The Hill (1965), Henry Salt in the 1971 film Willy Wonka & the Chocolate Factory, and cruise director Curtain in Juggernaut (1974), The Dick Emery Show (1979–1981), and in the sitcoms Man About the House (1974–1975), George and Mildred (1976–1979) and Cowboys (1980–1981).

Early life
Kinnear was born on 8 January 1934  in Wigan, Lancashire, the son of Annie (née Durie, previously Smith) and Roy Kinnear. He had a sister, Marjory. His parents were Scottish, originally from Edinburgh. He scored 81 tries in 184 games for Wigan; he collapsed and died while playing rugby union with the RAF in 1942, at the age of 38. Scotland Rugby League have named their Student Player of the Year Award after him.

Kinnear was educated at George Heriot's School in Edinburgh. At the age of 17, he enrolled in the Royal Academy of Dramatic Art (RADA).

Career
Kinnear's acting career began in 1955, playing Albert in The Young in Heart, at the repertory theatre, Newquay. In 1959 he joined Joan Littlewood's Theatre Workshop at the Theatre Royal Stratford East, performing in both the 1960 play and 1963 film of Sparrows Can't Sing. 

Kinnear's television debut was on the STV children's series, Mr. Fixit in 1959, before gaining national attention as a participant in the television show That Was the Week That Was.

Kinnear later appeared in many films and television shows, including Help!, Till Death Us Do Part, Doctor at Large, Man About the House, George and Mildred, The Dick Emery Show (as Gaylord's long-suffering father) and four episodes of The Avengers. He starred in Cowboys, a sitcom about builders. His best-known films are those he made with director and close friend Richard Lester: Help!, A Funny Thing Happened On the Way to the Forum, How I Won the War, The Bed Sitting Room, Juggernaut and the Musketeer series of the 1970s and 1980s.

He appeared with Christopher Lee in the Hammer horror film Taste the Blood of Dracula (1970). Also in 1970 he played Mr. Perkins, Melody's father in Waris Hussein's Melody, a puppy love story. He played the father of spoiled rich girl Veruca Salt in the film Willy Wonka & the Chocolate Factory (1971), an adaptation of Roald Dahl's children's novel Charlie and the Chocolate Factory.

He guest-starred in The Goodies' episode "Rome Antics" (1975) as the Roman Emperor, and in the BBC's Ripping Yarns episode "Escape From Stalag Luft 112B" (1977) as the fearsome German Sergeant Vogel.

He narrated and provided voices for the stop-motion children's television show Bertha. He appeared in two music videos for Mike and the Mechanics ("All I Need Is a Miracle" and "Taken In") as the band's manager; in the former, he was reunited with his Help! co-star Victor Spinetti.

He narrated Towser and Bertha, voiced Pipkin in the 1978 film Watership Down and voiced Texas Pete's henchman Bulk in SuperTed (also with Victor Spinetti, who voiced the evil Texas Pete). Kinnear appeared regularly on the stage. In later life he appeared in productions such as The Travails of Sancho Panza (playing the title role), and in The Cherry Orchard, in 1985.

His final completed roles were in A Man for All Seasons (1988) a made-for-television film directed by and starring Charlton Heston, John Gielgud and Vanessa Redgrave, as a patient in the BBC One hospital drama Casualty, and a voice role as Mump in The Princess and the Goblin, which was released in 1991, three years after his sudden death in September 1988. Following his death, the Casualty episode was postponed. It finally aired in August 1989.

Personal life 
Kinnear was married to actress Carmel Cryan. They had three children, including actor Rory and casting director Kirsty. Their elder daughter, Karina, was quadriplegic and had learning difficulties; she died of coronavirus in May 2020.

Death
 On 19 September 1988, Kinnear fell from a horse during the making of The Return of the Musketeers in Toledo, Spain, and sustained a broken pelvis and internal bleeding. He was taken to a hospital in Madrid, but died the next day from a heart attack, brought on by his injuries. He was 54 years old.

He was buried in East Sheen Cemetery, London. Following his death, Kinnear's family sued the production company and the film's director, charging, from eyewitness testimonies, that the producer was cutting corners to save money and time, and that the rushed speed of filming contributed to the accident. In 1991, they received a £650,000 settlement.

Legacy
In May 1994, the Roy Kinnear Trust, which was inspired by his daughter, Karina (1972–2020), was founded to help improve the life of young adults with physical and mental disabilities.

Shows
The Roy Kinnear Show
 The Clairvoyant

Filmography

 The World Owes Me a Living (1944) (uncredited)
 Oh... Rosalinda!! (1955)
 The Millionairess (1960) as Man Carrying Crate (uncredited)
 Tiara Tahiti (1962) as Capt. Enderby
 The Boys (1962) as Bus conductor (uncredited)
 Sparrows Can't Sing (1963) as Fred
 The Small World of Sammy Lee (1963) as Lucky Dave
 Heavens Above! (1963) as Fred Smith
 The Informers (1963) as Shorty
 French Dressing (1964) as Henry Liggott
 A Place to Go (1964) as Bunting
 A World of His Own (1964–65) as Stanley Blake
 The Avengers 1965, S04E09: The Hour That Never Was, as Benedict Napoleon Hickey (vagrant); also 1969, S06E33: Bizarre, as Bagpipes Happychap (of Happy Meadows Funeral Parlour)
 The Hill (1965) as Monty Bartlett
 Help! (1965) as Algernon
 A Funny Thing Happened on the Way to the Forum (1966) as Gladiator Instructor
 The Deadly Affair (1967) as Adam Scarr
 How I Won the War (1967) as Clapper
 The Mini-Affair (1967) as Fire Extinguisher Salesman
 Lock Up Your Daughters (1969) as Sir Tunbelly Clumsey
 The Bed Sitting Room (1969) as Plastic mac man
 Taste the Blood of Dracula (1970) as Weller
 On A Clear Day You Can See Forever (1970) as Prince Regent
 Scrooge (1970) as 2nd Gentleman of Charity
 Egghead's Robot (1970) as Park Keeper
 The Firechasers (1971) as Roscoe
 Melody (1971) as Mr. Perkins
 Willy Wonka & the Chocolate Factory (1971) as Henry Salt
 Madame Sin (1972) as Holidaymaker
 The Pied Piper (1972) as Burgermaster Poppendick
 The Alf Garnett Saga (1972) as Wally
 Raising the Roof (1972) as Dad Burke
 Alice's Adventures in Wonderland (1972) as Cheshire Cat
 That's Your Funeral (1972) as Purvis
 The Cobblers of Umbridge (1973) as Dan and Doris Cobbler
 The Three Musketeers (1973) as Planchet
 Juggernaut (1974) as Social Director Curtain
 The Four Musketeers (1974) as Planchet
 Barry McKenzie Holds His Own (1974) as Bishop of Paris
 Royal Flash (1975) (scenes deleted)
 The Amorous Milkman (1975) as Sergeant
 Eskimo Nell (1975) as Benny U. Murdoch
 Three for All (1975) as Hounslow Joe
 One of Our Dinosaurs Is Missing (1975) as Superintendent Grubbs
 The Adventure of Sherlock Holmes' Smarter Brother (1975) as Moriarty's Assistant
 Not Now, Comrade (1976) as Hoskins
 Herbie Goes to Monte Carlo (1977) as Quincey
 The Last Remake of Beau Geste (1977) as Boldini
 Ripping Yarns (1977) as Vogel
 The Hound of the Baskervilles (1978) as Selden the Axe Murderer
 Watership Down (1978) as Pipkin (voice)
 The London Connection (1979) as Bidley
 Quincy's Quest (1979) as Top
 High Rise Donkey (1980) as Mr. Garnett
 Hawk the Slayer (1980) as Innkeeper
 Cowboys (1980–81) as Joe Jones
 Rhubarb Rhubarb (1980) as Home Owner
 If You Go Down in the Woods Today (1981) as Fishfingers
 Blake's 7 – "Gold" (1981) as Keiller
 The Incredible Mr Tanner (1981, TV series) as  Sidney Pratt
 Hammett (1982) as English Eddie Hagedorn
 Anyone for Denis? (1982) as Boris
 The Boys in Blue (1982) as Mr. Lloyd
 Return of the Ewok (1982) as the Talent Agent
 SuperTed (1983–86) as Bulk
 Anna Pavlova (1983) as Gardener
 Towser (1984) as Narrator
 Squaring the Circle (1984) as Kania
 The Zany Adventures of Robin Hood (1984) as Friar Tuck
 Bertha (1985) as Narrator / Ted / Roy 
 Super Gran (1985) as Chistleton football manager
 Pirates (1986) as Dutch
 Hardwicke House (1987) as R G Wickham / Mr. Wickham
 Casanova (1987) as Balbi
 Unusual Ground Floor Conversion (1987) as Previous Tenant
 Mr. H Is Late (1987) as Piper
 The Ray Bradbury Theater – Episode 17: "There Was an Old Woman" – Funeral home director (1988)
 Storybook - The Elves and the Shoemaker (1988) (uncredited)
 Just Ask for Diamond (1988) as Jack Splendide
 A Man for All Seasons (1988) as The Common Man
 The Return of the Musketeers (1989) as Planchet
 The Princess and the Goblin (1991) as Mump (voice) (final film role)

Theatre (partial)
 Make Me an Offer
 Sparrers Can't Sing
 The Clandestine Marriage
 The Travails of Sancho Panza
 The Cherry Orchard
 The Duchess of Malfi
 Cinderella

References

External links
 
 
 Roy Kinnear House

1934 births
1988 deaths
20th-century English male actors
Alumni of RADA
Deaths by horse-riding accident in Spain
English male film actors
English male stage actors
English male television actors
English male voice actors
English people of Scottish descent
People educated at George Heriot's School
People from Wigan